The Alexandria Extension is a short rail line in Washington, D.C. and Prince George's County, Maryland.  Its northern portion connects the Capital Subdivision to the RF&P Subdivision, allowing freight trains to avoid Downtown Washington.  Its southern portion, the Shepherd Industrial Spur, extends south to Shepherds Landing, directly across the Potomac River from Alexandria, Virginia; service on this portion ended in 2001.

It is currently part of CSX Transportation's Capital Subdivision.

Route description 

The Alexandria Extension runs south 7.2 miles (11.6 km) from a junction in Hyattsville, Maryland to the beginning of the RF&P Subdivision just before the Anacostia Railroad Bridge in Southeast D.C. This busy route is used by freight trains to Virginia. This portion runs parallel to Benning Yard, the Landover Subdivision, the Washington Metro Orange Line, and the Anacostia Freeway for roughly the southern half of its length.

Its southern portion, the Shepherd Industrial Spur, continues running alongside the Anacostia Freeway until it reaches Joint Base Anacostia–Bolling.  It then travels within the grounds of the Base, the U.S. Naval Research Laboratory, and the Blue Plains Advanced Wastewater Treatment Plant.  Tracks have been removed along some portions of this route.

History 
The Alexandria Extension, originally called the Alexandria Branch, was built in 1874 and ran 12.5 miles (20.1 km) to Shepherds Landing along the eastern shore of the Potomac River, to provide a connection to Virginia. The B&O had lost access to the Long Bridge across the river in 1870 due to political maneuvering by the Baltimore and Potomac Railroad (B&P) (controlled by the Pennsylvania Railroad (PRR)).  In order to efficiently route its trains to points south of Washington, the B&O set up a car float operation at Shepherds Landing, which carried freight cars across the river to Alexandria, Virginia.

For many years the junction at Hyattsville, called Alexandria Junction, was controlled by JD Tower. B&O built its first interlocking tower building at the site in 1894, and rebuilt the tower in 1912 and again in 1917. CSX closed this tower in 1992, and demolished it in 1994 after a fire.

The ferry operation was discontinued in 1906 when the B&O obtained trackage rights from PRR. The B&O built a connecting track from the Alexandria Extension to the B&P's Anacostia Railroad Bridge, which provided access to PRR tracks in southwest D.C. (now called the CSX RF&P Subdivision) and the Long Bridge.

During World War II, the B&O re-activated the Shepherds Landing crossing at the request of the U.S. Army. The Army had requested an additional Potomac River crossing for troop movements to supplement those on the Long Bridge, and the Corps of Engineers built a temporary bridge across the river in 1942. Both B&O and PRR trains traveled over the 3,360 foot (1,020 m) bridge. Train operations on the bridge ceased in 1945 at the end of the war, and the bridge was demolished in 1947.

The original track from the junction at Anacostia Bridge to Shepherds Landing became known as the Shepherd Branch. This spur served several industries, including Bolling Air Force Base and the Blue Plains Advanced Wastewater Treatment Plant. (Shown as "Shepherd Industrial Track" on the diagram.) The Blue Plains plant was the only customer on the branch when rail service ended in 2001.

Plans were made to reuse the track as part of the Anacostia Line of the DC Streetcar, but this did not occur.

References 

CSX Transportation lines
Rail infrastructure in Maryland
Rail infrastructure in Washington, D.C.
Baltimore and Ohio Railroad lines